Nihad Pejković (born 23 October 1968) is a Bosnian retired football goalkeeper.

International career
Pejković made his debut for Bosnia and Herzegovina in a June 1998 friendly match away against Macedonia and earned a total of 2 caps. His second and final international was a January 1999 friendly away against Malta.

References

External links

1968 births
Living people
Association football goalkeepers
Bosnia and Herzegovina footballers
Bosnia and Herzegovina international footballers
NK Olimpija Ljubljana (1945–2005) players
NK Ljubljana players
NK Ivančna Gorica players
NK Mura players
Eordaikos 2007 F.C. players
Kastoria F.C. players
Slovenian PrvaLiga players
Gamma Ethniki players
Football League (Greece) players
Bosnia and Herzegovina expatriate footballers
Expatriate footballers in Slovenia
Bosnia and Herzegovina expatriate sportspeople in Slovenia
Expatriate footballers in Greece
Bosnia and Herzegovina expatriate sportspeople in Greece
Association football goalkeeping coaches
Bosnia and Herzegovina football managers
Bosnia and Herzegovina expatriate football managers
Expatriate football managers in Austria
Bosnia and Herzegovina expatriate sportspeople in Austria
SV Horn managers